The American Central Railway was originally named the Western Air Line Railroad. The American Central Railway was incorporated on February 21, 1859, as a name change of the Western Air Line Railroad. The Western Airline had not laid any track prior to 1859. In 1868, work was started on a 50.59 mile line from Galva, Illinois to New Boston, Illinois. Work was completed in October 1869.

On June 1, 1899, the American Central Railway was sold to the Chicago, Burlington and Quincy Railroad.

References

 
Defunct Illinois railroads